Methitural (INN; Neraval, Thiogenal), or methitural sodium, also known as methioturiate, is a barbiturate derivative which was marketed in the 1950s in Europe (in Germany and Italy) as an ultra-short-acting intravenous anesthetic.

Synthesis

A somewhat more complex side chain is incorporated by alkylation of the carbanion of the substituted cyanoacetate (1) with 2-chloroethylmethyl sulfide (2). Condensation of the resulting cyanoester (3) with thiourea followed by hydrolysis of the resulting imine affords methitural.

See also 
 Barbiturate

References 

General anesthetics
Thiobarbiturates
GABAA receptor positive allosteric modulators